Norley Copse and Meadow is a  biological Site of Special Scientific Interest east of Lymington in Hampshire. It is part of New Forest Ramsar site and Special Protection Area.

The Crockford Stream runs through this site, which has old oak woodland with hazel coppice and unimproved grassland which is managed by grazing. The meadow has 140 species of higher plants and it is also rich in invertebrates, including eight species of dragonfly and a rare picture-winged fly, Sphenella marginata.

References

Sites of Special Scientific Interest in Hampshire
Ramsar sites in England
Special Protection Areas in England